Emily Dreyfuss (born 1983) is an American journalist. She is a Senior Fellow on the Technology and Social Change team at Harvard's Shorenstein Center for Media, Politics, and Public Policy, where she edits the Media Manipulation Casebook and is the co-lead of the Harvard Shorenstein Center News Leaders program, which develops best practices for newsrooms to deal with misinformation. Dreyfuss was a 2018 Nieman Berkman Klein Fellow, the founding editorial director of the tech news site Protocol, and a Senior Editor and Writer at WIRED magazine.

Career
Dreyfuss told Politico that she began her career at a local paper in Connecticut, then moved to an alt-weekly, and entered tech journalism in 2007 when she joined CNET. She co-hosted a podcast with CNET and ran the website's homepage and social media accounts. Dreyfuss joined WIRED in 2014 as News Editor, and served as the editor of the opinion section, the cybersecurity section, and the founding editor of the national affairs section that was created to cover the 2016 presidential election. In 2019 she left WIRED to found Protocol, a tech news site created by the publisher of Politico to cover the "people, power, and politics" of tech. In 2020, she joined the Shorenstein Center.

Dreyfuss has appeared on NBC News, C-SPAN, ABC News, NPR, Fox, and other broadcast news programs. In 2018, Dreyfuss hosted an episode of the radio program On Point from WBUR and was featured on tour with PopUp Magazine, where she performed a story about the experience of yelling at an Amazon Echo, which was later published in text form by WIRED.

Dreyfuss' writing has appeared in The New York Times, The Atlantic, The San Francisco Chronicle, Mother Jones, The Correspondent, Business Insider, and elsewhere. Dreyfuss is a keynote speaker, represented by APB speakers bureau, and has delivered keynotes on topics such as algorithmic bias, social media harms, remote work, and the impacts of tech on society and personality.

Personal life 
Dreyfuss is the oldest child of actors Richard Dreyfuss and Jeramie Rain, and the sister of journalist Ben and actor Harry Dreyfuss. She is married to geneticist Seth Shipman.

References 

1983 births
Living people
21st-century American journalists
American women journalists